Gaspard Duché de Vancy (1756–1788) was a French artist of the 18th century. He grew up in Vienna and exhibited not only at Paris' Salon of Young Artists (1781), but also at London's Royal Academy (1784). He was particularly active in portraiture, producing images of Stanislaus of Poland (1784), the secretary of the Kingdom of Naples (1784) and Marie Antoinette, and was also taken on as the official artist of the La Perouse expedition, on which he disappeared. His skull was thought to have been found off Vanikoro in April 2003, but DNA tests proved inconclusive.

See also
List of people who disappeared mysteriously at sea

References

External links
Exploration & Discovery: 1770–1840 - Lieutenant Blondela and Gaspard Duché de Vancy
Gaspard Duché de Vancy in the RKD

1756 births
1780s missing person cases
1788 deaths
18th-century French painters
18th-century French people
Artists from Vienna
French male painters
People lost at sea
18th-century French male artists